New York City's 29th City Council district is one of 51 districts in the New York City Council. It has been represented by Democrat Lynn Schulman since 2022. Schulman succeeded Karen Koslowitz, who was term-limited in 2021.

Geography
District 29 is based in Forest Hills in central Queens, also covering Kew Gardens, Rego Park, and eastern Richmond Hill.

The district overlaps with Queens Community Boards 5, 6, and 9, and with New York's 5th and 6th congressional districts. It also overlaps with the 10th, 14th, 15th, and 16th districts of the New York State Senate, and with the 24th, 27th, 28th, 30th, and 35th districts of the New York State Assembly.

Recent election results

2021
In 2019, voters in New York City approved Ballot Question 1, which implemented ranked-choice voting in all local elections. Under the new system, voters have the option to rank up to five candidates for every local office. Voters whose first-choice candidates fare poorly will have their votes redistributed to other candidates in their ranking until one candidate surpasses the 50 percent threshold. If one candidate surpasses 50 percent in first-choice votes, then ranked-choice tabulations will not occur.

2017

2013

References

New York City Council districts